The 2009–10 Libyan Cup was the 20th edition of the competition since its inception in 1976. Nasr secured their third title, defeating Madina 2–1 in a close final at the 11 June Stadium.

Round of 32

The draw for the Round of 32 was made on January 7, 2010. If scores are level after 90 minutes, then the tie goes to a penalty shootout. Ties were played from January 18–20.

1 Score after 90 minutes

Round of 16

The draw for the round of 16 was made on January 28, 2010, at 21:30 EET.

1 Score after 90 minutes

Quarter finals

1 Madina awarded tie, after Ahly Tripoli quit the competition amid protests with the Libyan Football Federation.

Semi finals
Draw made on May 20, at LFF headquarters in Tripoli.

Final

References

 
Libyan Football Cup
Cup